Norman Joseph McAtee (June 28, 1921 – August 25, 2010) was a Canadian ice hockey player who played 13 games in the National Hockey League with the Boston Bruins during the 1946–47 season. The rest of his career, which lasted from 1941 to 1954, was spent in various minor leagues.

Playing career
Born in Stratford, Ontario, he and his brother Jud played together in junior ice hockey with the Oshawa Generals during the years when the Generals dominated the Ontario Hockey League, winning championships with them in 1938–39. 1939–40 and 1940–41. At the end of the 1941 season, Norm joined his brother by signing as a free agent with the Detroit Red Wings in the NHL. However, beginning in 1942 and lasting throughout World War II, Norm became a flying officer in the Royal Canadian Air Force. After his discharge in 1945, he teamed with his brother in the Red Wings farm system before the two of them were traded to the Chicago Blackhawks for Doug McCaig in December 1945. Just over a month later, Chicago traded him to Boston for Bill Jennings, and Norm joined the Bruins for 13 games, recording one assist. After that, he finished his career in the minor leagues, ending as player-coach with the Troy Bruins in Troy, Ohio from 1951 to 1954.

Post-playing career
After his retirement from hockey, McAtee stayed in Troy, becoming a referee in the International Hockey League and a color commentator for Dayton Gems games. He also worked for Sherwin-Williams until his retirement in 1984. He died in Troy, Ohio in 2010.

Career statistics

Regular season and playoffs

References

External links
 

1921 births
2010 deaths
Boston Bruins players
Canadian ice hockey centres
Canadian military personnel of World War II
Hershey Bears players
Ice hockey people from Ontario
Indianapolis Capitals players
Omaha Knights (AHA) players
Ontario Hockey Association Senior A League (1890–1979) players
Oshawa Generals players
Philadelphia Rockets players
Sherbrooke Saints players
St. Louis Flyers players
Sportspeople from Stratford, Ontario
Troy Bruins players
Tulsa Oilers (USHL) players
Washington Lions players
Canadian expatriates in the United States